Willie  Cole (born 1955 in Somerville, New Jersey) is a contemporary American sculptor, printer, and conceptual and visual artist. His work uses contexts of postmodern eclecticism, and combines references and appropriation from African and African-American imagery. He also has used Dada’s readymades and Surrealism’s transformed objects, as well as icons of American pop culture or African and Asian masks.

Works

Cole is best known for assembling and transforming ordinary domestic and used objects such as irons, ironing boards, high-heeled shoes, hair dryers, bicycle parts, wooden matches, lawn jockeys, and other discarded appliances and hardware, into imaginative and powerful works of art and installations.

In 1989, Cole garnered attention in the art world with works using the steam iron as a motif. Cole imprinted iron scorch marks on a variety of media, showing not only their wide-ranging decorative potential but also to reference his Cole’s African-American heritage. He used the marks to suggest the transport and branding of slaves, the domestic role of black women, and ties to Ghanaian cloth design and Yoruba gods.

Through the repetitive use of single objects in multiples, Cole’s assembled sculptures acquire a transcending and renewed metaphorical meaning, or become a critique of our consumer culture. Cole’s work is generally discussed in the context of postmodern eclecticism, combining references and appropriation ranging from African and African-American imagery, to Dada’s readymades and Surrealism’s transformed objects, and icons of American pop culture or African and Asian masks, into highly original and witty assemblages. Some of Cole’s interactive installations also draw on simple game board structures that include the element of chance while physically engaging the viewer.

His "Anne Klein With a Baby in Transit," from 2009, uses discarded high-heeled shoes to depict a mother and child. The well-worn black shoes combine to recall traditional African sculptures. It was a gift from the Brenden Mann Foundation to the Minneapolis Institute of Arts.

Cole's work is included in the Afrofuturist Period Room exhibition Before Yesterday We Could Fly at the Metropolitan Museum of Art.

Shows

Solo shows 

 2012, Highpoint Editions, Minneapolis, Five Beauties Rising: New Prints by Willie Cole

Group shows 
 2017, Highpoint Editions, Minneapolis, Operation Chromebody
 2017, Alexander and Bonin, New York, Walker Street Summer
 2015, MCA Chicago, Chicago, Surrealism: The Conjured Life
 2012, Tamarind Institute, Albuquerque, Afro: Black Identity in America and Brazil

Life

Early life 
Willie Cole, a native of Sommerville, New jersey later moved to Newark, New Jersey, where he found a passion for the field of arts. He later took classes at the Newark Museum. After attending the museum for lessons he was accepted to the Arts High School of Newark. He attended the Boston University School of Fine Arts, received his Bachelor of Fine Arts degree from the School of Visual Arts in New York in 1976, and continued his studies at the Art Students League of New York from 1976 to 1979.

Career 
In 1978, he found work as a graphic designer for the Queens County Borough Hall as part of the Comprehensive Employment and Training Act's employment of artists. Further pursuing his passion, Willie later progressed and hosted his first major gallery show, located at  Franklin Furnace Gallery in New York City, in 1989.  In 1990 he participated as the Artist-In-Residence, In the Studio Museum, located in Harlem, New York. Willie Cole is the recipient of many awards, including the 2006 David C. Driskell Prize, the first national award to honor and celebrate contributions to the field of African-American art and art history, established by the High Museum of Art in Atlanta, Georgia. Cole is represented by Alexander and Bonin Gallery in New York; and by Guido Maus, beta pictoris gallery / Maus Contemporary in Birmingham, AL.

In 2023, Cole's work With a Heart of Gold, was acquired by the Pérez Art Museum Miami through the institution's Fund for Black Art program.

Museum collections
Willie Cole's work is found in numerous private and public collections and museums around the world, including:
Albright-Knox Art Gallery, Buffalo, N.Y.
Allen Memorial Art Museum, Oberlin College, Oberlin, Ohio
American Academy of Arts and Letters, New York City
Art Gallery of Ontario, Toronto, Canada
Asheville Art Museum, Asheville, North Carolina
Baltimore Museum of Art, Baltimore, Md.
Birmingham Museum of Art, Birmingham, Ala.
Bronx Museum of the Arts, New York City
Cleveland Museum of Art, Cleveland, Ohio
The College of New Jersey, Ewing Township, N.J.
Columbia Museum of Art, Columbia, S.C.
Columbus Museum of Art, Columbus, Ohio
Dallas Museum of Art, Dallas, Texas
 Davis Museum and Cultural Center, Wellesley College, Wellesley, Mass.
Detroit Institute of Arts, Detroit, Mich.
 FRAC-Lorraine, Metz, France
Herbert F. Johnson Museum of Art, Ithaca, N.Y.
High Museum of Art, Atlanta, Ga.
Hunter Museum of American Art, Chattanooga, TN
Iris & B. Gerald Cantor Center for Visual Arts, Stanford University, Palo Alto, Calif.
Metropolitan Museum of Art, New York
Memorial Art Gallery, University of Rochester, New York
Minneapolis Institute of Arts, Minneapolis, Minn.
Montclair Art Museum, Montclair, N.J.
Muscarelle Museum of Art, Williamsburg, VA
Museum of Contemporary Art, Chicago
Museum of Modern Art, New York City
National Gallery of Art, Washington, D.C.
New Britain Museum of American Art, New Britain, Conn.
New Jersey State Museum, Trenton
New York Public Library, New York City
Newark Museum, Newark, N.J.
North Carolina Museum of Art, Raleigh, NC
Norton Museum of Art, West Palm Beach, Fla.
Orlando Museum of Art, Orlando, Fla.
  Palmer Museum of Art, Penn State University, University Park, PA
Pennsylvania Academy of Fine Arts, Philadelphia
Pérez Art Museum Miami, Fla. 
Philadelphia Museum of Art, Philadelphia
Saint Louis Art Museum, St. Louis, Mo.
San Antonio Museum of Art, San Antonio, Tx
Sheldon Memorial Art Gallery, University of Nebraska, Lincoln
Southeastern Center for Contemporary Art, Winston-Salem, N.C.
Speed Art Museum, Louisville, Ky.
Spencer Museum of Art, Lawrence, KS.
The Studio Museum in Harlem, New York, NY.
Tamarind Institute, University of New Mexico, Albuquerque
Tampa Museum of Art, Tampa, Fla.
Tweed Museum of Art, University of Minnesota, Duluth
University Art Museum, University of California, Santa Barbara
Virginia Museum of Fine Arts, Richmond
Walker Art Center, Minneapolis, Minn.
Whitney Museum of American Art, New York City
Worcester Art Museum, Worcester, Mass.
Yale University Art Gallery, New Haven, Conn.

References

External links
Willie Cole’s website
Willie Cole’s art in Artcyclopedia
Willie Cole's Art Gallery
TV Interview with Willie Cole, and other video clips
Willie Cole at MoMA
Willie Cole at Minneapolis Institute of Arts, Minneapolis, MN

1955 births
Living people
African-American contemporary artists
American contemporary artists
20th-century American sculptors
21st-century American sculptors
21st-century American male artists
American male sculptors
American conceptual artists
Postmodern artists
Artists from Newark, New Jersey
Franklin Furnace artists
Sculptors from New Jersey
African-American sculptors
20th-century African-American artists
21st-century African-American artists
20th-century American male artists